Benjamin David Simons is a British theoretical physicist, working in the field of theoretical condensed matter physics and in biophysics.

Simons holds the Herchel Smith Chair in Physics at the University of Cambridge Cavendish Laboratory, and he is also a Group Leader in the Gurdon Institute. In 2013 he became head of the Theory of Condensed Matter (TCM) group in the Cavendish.

Honours and awards
2001 awarded the Maxwell Medal and Prize by Institute of Physics 
2014 awarded the Franklin Medal and Prize by the Institute of Physics. 
2015 awarded the Gabor Medal by the Royal Society of the United Kingdom.
2021 elected a Fellow of the Royal Society.

Biography
Simons has two brothers, Thomas and Joseph. His father is a professor at Oxford University, Professor John P. Simons. He is married and has two children.

References

External links

Living people
British physicists
Fellows of St John's College, Cambridge
Theoretical physicists
Maxwell Medal and Prize recipients
Fellows of the Royal Society
Year of birth missing (living people)